Andrew Chen Kah Eng is a Malaysian politician from the Democratic Action Party (DAP), a component party of the Pakatan Harapan (PH) and formerly Pakatan Rakyat (PR) opposition coalitions who has served as Leader of the Opposition of Johor since December 2022 and Member of the Johor State Legislative Assembly (MLA) for Stulang since May 2013.  He has also served as State Secretary of DAP of Johor from 2021 to 2023.

Personal life 
Born in Kuching, Sarawak, he moved to the state of Johor for his university studies in the University of Technology, Malaysia. He holds an Honour Degree in Land Surveying and a degree in Master of Science (Satellite Surveying).He is a Roman Catholic, who serves as a lector in the Roman Catholic Cathedral of the Sacred Heart of Jesus, Johor Bahru.

Political career

Member of the Johor State Legislative Assembly for Stulang and Member of the Democratic Action Party 
In the 2013 Johor state election, Chen was nominated by the Democratic Action Party (DAP), then component party of the Pakatan Rakyat (PR) opposition coalition to contest for the Stulang state seat and won the state seat with 19,799 votes by defeating Chong Chee Siong of the Malaysian Chinese Association (MCA), a component party of the ruling Barisan Nasional (BN) coalition with 3,296 votes of majority.

In the 2018 Johor state election, Chen was renominated by DAP, a component party of a new Pakatan Harapan (PH) opposition coalition to defend the Stulang state seat. He went on to win the seat again with 24,002 votes by defeating Ang Boon Heng of MCA and BN with a significantly increased majority of 12,470 votes. PH also defeated BN in the election and the first change of government happened with PH replacing BN to form the new state government after being elected democratically. However, as an MLA of PH, Chen was not appointed as Member of the Johor State Executive Council (EXCO), the executive body of the Johor state government.

In the 2021 Johor DAP election, he was elected into the Johor DAP committee as a member and was subsequently appointed as new secretary of the committee by Liew Chin Tong, who also made into the committee after receiving third highest amount of votes of 561 after Yeo Bee Yin (631) and Teo Nie Ching (531) and was reappointed as the chairman. 

In the 2022 Johor state election, Chen was again renominated by DAP and PH, again an opposition coalition after its collapse of state government in February 2020, to defend the Stulang state seat. He went on to win the seat again with 12,499 votes by defeating all of his opponents Ang Boon Heng of MCA and BN who challenged him again, Yap Chiang Youis of Perikatan Nasional (PN) and Parti Gerakan Rakyat Malaysia (GERAKAN), Saiful Bahari Sahari of Parti Bangsa Malaysia (PBM) and independent Moharam Baharom with a dramatically decreased majority of 2,866 votes. PH was defeated by BN and the latter was reelected to form the state government of Johor.

Chairman of Special Task Force on the Issues of Traffic Congestion in the Sultan Iskandar Building  and Immigration and Quarantine Complex 

In July 2018, Andrew was appointed by the Johor State Government to lead a special task force to look into the traffic congestion issues in the Sultan Iskandar Building (BSI) customs, immigration and quarantine (CIQ) complex.

The study took the special task force four months to complete, and a report was submitted in January 2019.

In the report, the special task force made 11 recommendations on how to ease the traffic congestion. The 11 recommendations are:

 Setting up a single agency at the CIQ to reduce bureaucracy in the management of the border checkpoint
 Increase the number of immigration officers during peak hours
 Combining the immigration, road charge and PLUS counters into a single counter for the clearance of inbound cars
 Improve the Malaysia Automated Clearance System (MACS) and increase the number of E-Gates for inbound passenger hall, and readjust the algorithm of the Secured Automated Clearance System (MBIKE) for inbound Malaysian motorcyclists.
 Minimise and eventually abolish top-up transactions for Touch ’n Go cards at the inbound car lanes within a year
 Consult Singapore authorities about increasing the frequency of the Johor Bahru-Woodlands train service, extend the bus services until 1 am, encourage transport operations from both countries to provide shuttle services along the causeway, and make Touch ’n Go top-up transactions available in Singapore
 Limit the time a factory bus can stop at the complex and rearrange the parking bays for the factory vans and buses
 Place light-emitting diode signages at the A, B, C and D zones for the inbound cars to avoid bottleneck. Place The People's Volunteer Corps (Rela) and auxiliary police personnel to help control traffic. Ensure the number of counters opened in zones A and B are the same as in zone C and D
 Improve the online ticketing system for Keretapi Tanah Melayu Bhd's Tebrau train service
 Make sure the Rapid Transit System Link becomes a reality, while following up on proposals such as the Malaysia-Singapore Third Crossing, travelator and pedestrian walkways for the causeway, and diverting all heavy vehicles to the Second Link
 Use big data and artificial intelligence for border checks and optimise the sharing of data among all agencies at the complex. Identify the patterns and norms of users to plan ahead and forecast incidents

Cross Border Breastmilk Delivery 
On 18 March 2020, the Malaysia government enforced a Movement Control Order (MCO) to curb the spread of COVID-19. The order included strict travel restrictions between Malaysia and Singapore, where many Malaysians travel to for work and social visit purposes. Since citizens from both countries were not allowed to travel freely anymore many Malaysian mothers, who are employed in Singapore, had no means to bring back their breastmilk to their babies in Malaysia. Prior to MCO, these mothers travelled regularly between the two countries to bring back the breastmilk themselves.

When approached by these mothers for help, Andrew decided to make all the necessary arrangements to assist them in bringing back their breastmilk to babies all across peninsula Malaysia.

This project is still on-going and deliveries are currently being made monthly.

Malaysia Book Of Records 
On 19 April 2021, for his contribution in the cross border breast milk delivery, Andrew was presented with a Malaysia Book Of Records for the Largest Cross-Border Breast Milk Relief Aid Delivery During MCO.

The presentation was witnessed by MP for Kulai, Teo Nie Ching.

Special Bus Transportation Arrangement for the Vulnerable 
The sudden implementation of the MCO also meant that many elderly, children and pregnant ladies were not able to travel back to Malaysia in time before the enforcement started. As part of the travel restriction, all land public transport services between the two countries were suspended indefinitely. Therefore, while Malaysians were still able to return to Malaysia, people in the vulnerable group faced difficulties travelling back as the only way was to walk across the causeway.

To assist them Andrew, with the help of private bus operators and the High Commission of Malaysia in Singapore, managed to arrange special bus transportation arrangement for them.

In total, 4 such arrangements were made, and more than 200 vulnerable people successfully travelled back to Malaysia safely.

Election results

References 

Living people
1975 births
Democratic Action Party (Malaysia) politicians
21st-century Malaysian politicians